Guatemala competed in the Summer Olympic Games for the first time at the 1952 Summer Olympics in Helsinki, Finland. 21 competitors, 20 men and 1 woman, took part in 26 events in 6 sports.

Athletics

Cycling

Track Competition
Men's 1.000m Time Trial
Gustavo Martínez
 Final — 1:18.9 (→ 24th place)

Men's 1.000m Sprint Scratch Race
Gustavo Martínez — 26th place

Fencing

Three fencers, all men, represented Guatemala in 1952.

Men's foil
 Rubén Soberón
 Eduardo López

Men's épée
 Rubén Soberón
 Antonio Chocano
 Eduardo López

Men's sabre
 Eduardo López

Shooting

Three shooters represented Guatemala in 1952.

25 m pistol
 José Gómez
 Francisco Sandoval

50 m pistol
 Francisco Sandoval

300 m rifle, three positions
 Alfredo Mury

50 m rifle, prone
 José Gómez
 Alfredo Mury

Swimming

Wrestling

References

External links
Official Olympic Reports

Nations at the 1952 Summer Olympics
1952
Olympics